The Calà del Sasso is a path leading down from the village of Sasso di Asiago towards the town of Valstagna, province of Vicenza, north-eastern Italy. It has 4444 steps, is 2.546 km long, and is the longest staircase  in Italy as well as the world's longest staircase open to the public (the service stairway for Niesen Funicular is longer, but only open to the public once a year). The highest and lowest points on the path differ by 744 m. Next to the staircase runs a gully. Both gully and steps are paved in limestone. The gully was used to transport timber from Sasso downhill. Once in Valstagna, Calà del Sasso ends near the river Brenta, where the logs were floated to Venice; here, in the times of the Republic of Venice, they were used in the local arsenal for the construction of boats.

References

External links
Page  at Club Alpino Italiano website 

Hiking trails in Italy
Mountains of Veneto